Paul Keene may refer to:

 Paul K. Keene (1910–2005), organic farmer
 Paul F. Keene Jr. (1920–2009), artist and teacher